Marcelo Duarte Matias served as the Foreign Minister of Portugal, ambassador to France, and Governor of the province of Angola.

Portuguese opposition leader Humberto Delgado went to the Brazilian embassy in Lisbon on January 12, 1959, requesting asylum as he feared the Salazar government would arrest him for challenging Salazar's continued rule, specifically by asking Welsh Labour politician Aneurin Bevan to come to Portugal. As Foreign Minister, Matias refused to recognize Delgado's status as a political refugee. Matias insisted that as a free citizen of Portugal, Delgado had to return to Portugal from Brazil's embassy and then apply to leave Portugal. The diplomatic spat damaged bilateral relations between Brazil and Portugal.

References

Portuguese diplomats
Foreign relations of Brazil
Foreign ministers of Portugal
Colonial people in Angola
Ambassadors of Portugal to France